Michel Miklík (born July 31, 1982) is a Slovak ice hockey player who currently plays for HK Trnava of the Slovak 1. Liga.

Career
Miklík began playing junior ice hockey in his hometown club ŠHK 37 Piešťany. He debuted at senior level in the 2001–02 season for MHk 32 Liptovský Mikuláš. He has won the Slovak Extraliga title for HC Košice in the 2008–09 and 2010–11 season. He signed for HC Slovan Bratislava before their first KHL season.

International play
Miklík played at the 2012 IIHF World Championship, where Slovakia was defeated by Russia in the final game.

Career statistics

Regular season and playoffs

International

References

External links

1982 births
Living people
Sportspeople from Piešťany
Slovak ice hockey left wingers
MHk 32 Liptovský Mikuláš players
HC '05 Banská Bystrica players
MsHK Žilina players
HC Košice players
HK Dukla Trenčín players
HC Slovan Bratislava players
Amur Khabarovsk players
ŠHK 37 Piešťany players
Olympic ice hockey players of Slovakia
Ice hockey players at the 2014 Winter Olympics
HC Kometa Brno players
JYP Jyväskylä players
Bratislava Capitals players
Dragons de Rouen players
HK Trnava players
Slovak expatriate ice hockey players in Russia
Slovak expatriate ice hockey players in the Czech Republic
Slovak expatriate ice hockey players in Finland
Slovak expatriate sportspeople in France
Expatriate ice hockey players in France